Morteza Aghili (born 11 September 1944) is an Iranian actor and director.

He started his activity in 1962 by joining in the Shahin Sarkisian Theater Group and experienced professional cinema in 1971 with his role in the movie Kako, directed by Shapoor Gharib. Morteza Aghili left Iran after the 1979 revolution and currently resides in Los Angeles, USA, and plays a role in some of the Gem channel series.

Films

Actor 

 Beautiful city (2016)
 Rugged Land (2016)
 The Fifth Rider of Destiny (1980)
 Worship (1978)
 Qadghan
 Safe place (1977)
 There is no news in the city (1977)
 Hello Tehran (1977)
 Sunny Night (1977)
 Wounded Night (1977)
 Shark South (1977)
 Paper Flowers (1977)
 Innocent (1976)
 Awake in the City (1976)
 Reward of a Man (1976)
 Award (1976)
 Black Fortune
 City of Wine (1976)
 Gold Heel (1975)
 Goodbye little one (1975)
 Sharaf (1975)
 Distance (1975)
 Oriental man and Western woman (1975)
 Mr. Mehdi enters (1974)
 Avesta Karim Nokrtim (1974)
 Doctor and Dancer (1974)
 Under the skin of the night (1974)
 Hello love
 Cage
 Hostage (1974)
 Passenger
 Mr. Ignorant (1973)
 Shoes
 Chase to Hell (1973)
 Southern
 Fantasy (1973)
 The enemy
 Virgin Girl (1973)
 Rebellion

Director 

 Safe place (1977)
 Paper Flowers (1977)
 Innocent (1976)
 Distance (1975)

Writer 

 Safe place (1977)
 Paper Flowers (1977)
 Distance (1975)

Producer 

 Safe place (1977)
 Paper Flowers (1977)
 Distance (1975)

Singer 

 Cages

External links

References

1941 births
Living people
Iranian male actors
Iranian film directors
Iranian male film actors
Iranian emigrants to the United States